Joseph Laurence Lynch (16 July 1925 – 1 August 2001) was an Irish actor who had a long career in both comedy and drama. He provided voice work for children's animated series, in particular Chorlton and the Wheelies.

Lynch was also a singer and songwriter, performing in the film Johnny Nobody (1961). He also recorded work by other songwriters, including Leo Maguire's "The Whistling Gypsy" and Dick Farrelly's "Cottage by the Lee", one of his biggest 1950s recordings.

Early life
Born in Mallow in County Cork, Lynch attended the North Monastery Christian Brothers School. He had a number of other jobs before moving into acting and broadcasting full time.

Career
Initially acting part-time with the Cork Shakespearean Company and at the Cork Opera House, by 1947 Lynch was acting full-time.

He was a founding member of the Radio Éireann Players and appeared in productions of Teresa Deevy plays  among others. Between 1967–81, he acted onstage with the Abbey Theatre. During the 1950s he was responsible for a Radio Éireann show Living with Lynch, broadcast on Sunday nights — the first comedy series on Radio Éireann.

Lynch appeared in the popular ABC/Thames Television sitcom Never Mind the Quality, Feel the Width (1968–70), and its spin-off feature film in 1973. Other notable film roles included The Siege of Sidney Street (1960), The Running Man (1963), Girl with Green Eyes (1964), The Face of Fu Manchu (1965), Ulysses (1967), Loot (1970), The Mackintosh Man (1973), The Outsider (1980), If You Go Down in the Woods Today (1981) and Eat the Peach (1986). In the 1970s, Lynch made regular guest appearances as Elsie Tanner's boyfriend in the long-running Granada TV soap Coronation Street.

In 1962, and again in 1977, Lynch won a Jacob's Award for his acting on RTÉ television.

By 1979, Lynch was back in Ireland, and made his first appearances as Dinny Byrne in the RTÉ soap Bracken. Later the Byrne character would feature in the long-running RTÉ soap Glenroe.

Lynch quit Glenroe after he claimed to have been "shamefully treated" and offered "small potatoes" when he asked for a pay rise. He was also upset that he was not to get a pension. RTÉ disputed those claims. Lynch criticised RTÉ for preventing him from doing other acting work alongside Glenroe. "I was terrible restricted in RTÉ, they wouldn't let me off for anything, even commercials."

Lynch voiced the main antagonist, "Grundel the Toad", in the Don Bluth film Thumbelina, his final audio work before his death seven years later.

Filmography

Film

Television

References

External links
 Joe Lynch at the Abbey Theatre Archive
 Joe Lynch at the Teresa Deevy Archive
 Audio clip from Radio Éireann's Living with Lynch

1925 births
2001 deaths
Irish male film actors
Irish male singer-songwriters
Irish male soap opera actors
Irish male television actors
Irish male voice actors
Jacob's Award winners
People from County Cork
RTÉ Radio presenters
RTÉ Radio 1 presenters
20th-century Irish  male singers
People educated at North Monastery